The East San Fernando Valley Light Rail Transit Project (formerly the East San Fernando Valley Transit Corridor Project) is a transit project which proposes the construction of a light rail line on the east side of Los Angeles's San Fernando Valley, running on a north/south route along Van Nuys Boulevard and San Fernando Road. Metro selected its preferred route as light rail without tunneling, "Alternative Six". The final Environmental Impact Report is in progress and the light rail line is scheduled for construction in mid-2023, with completion in 2028.

The project is being planned by the Los Angeles County Metropolitan Transportation Authority (Metro). The line has been given high priority by Metro in its long-range plan, and funding for the project is included in Measure R and Measure M.
The project's timeline was accelerated under the Twenty-eight by '28 initiative.

In June 2018, Metro staff recommended the corridor be built as an at-grade rail line, making it a part of the Los Angeles Metro Rail system. In December 2020, Metro approved the Final EIR with the option to build the rail line in segments.

On December 2, 2022, Metro officially began advanced utility relocation for the line.

Overview

The northern end of the proposed line is Sylmar/San Fernando Station, providing a connection to the Metrolink Antelope Valley Line, and the southern end would be the G Line's Van Nuys Station. An important intermediary stop would be at the currently existing Van Nuys Metrolink and Amtrak station, where passengers could transfer to the Ventura County Line, Amtrak routes, and the proposed Sepulveda Transit Corridor to the Westside. The Metro staff recommendation included 14 stations for the  line.

The Pacific Electric San Fernando Line ran a north-south line between Downtown Los Angeles and San Fernando, partially on Van Nuys Avenue, from 1911 to 1952 before being dismantled and converted to bus service. The project route was portrayed in the project map included in the 1980 Proposition A documentation. Metro Rapid bus lines that serve the route  are route 761 on Van Nuys Boulevard, with additional Metro Local lines supplementing both. Planning for the line will take into consideration other major planned infrastructure projects, including a Sepulveda Transit Corridor rail link and the conversion of the G Line from bus rapid transit to light rail.

The Draft Environmental Impact Report was completed and released in September 2017, and the final clearance was granted by the Federal Transit Administration in February 2021.

History
Six initial alternatives were developed during the environmental review process:

Route Selection: Alternative Six
In June 2018, Metro staff recommended a modified version of Alternative 6, using high-floor light rail vehicles like other Metro Rail lines but entirely on the street and at grade. The underground section between Sherman Way and Roscoe stations was eliminated, due to the high costs of tunneling.

Metro approved the project with $1.3 billion in funds, initiating the final EIR. The northern terminus will be the Sylmar/San Fernando Metrolink station. The light rail train will run southeast for two and a half miles on San Fernando Road to Van Nuys Boulevard. It then heads south on Van Nuys Boulevard for  reaching the Van Nuys Metrolink station. Its southern terminus will be the Van Nuys G Line station near L.A.'s Van Nuys City Hall  further south.

Construction
The line is planned to be built in two phases: the first runs from the Van Nuys G Line station to San Fernando Road with the remaining segment to be completed later. Groundbreaking is scheduled for mid-2023 with operations anticipated to begin in 2028 or 2030. Funds were being acquired by 2020, with $800 million coming from Measure M, $200 million from Road Repair and Accountability Act gas tax, and $200 million from other state-level sources. The Federal Transit Administration intends to provide $909 million between 2022 and 2023 to fund the project. The capital project cost for the first phase is estimated to be $3.635 billion. Utility work along the line began in December 2022. In January 2023, the project was awarded another $600 million out of the state's Transit and Intercity Rail Capital Program, originating from the state's budget surplus in prior years.

References

External links

Transportation in Los Angeles
Transportation in the San Fernando Valley
Los Angeles County Metropolitan Transportation Authority
Los Angeles Metro Rail projects
Public transportation in Los Angeles
Public transportation in Los Angeles County, California
Proposed railway lines in California
2028 in rail transport